Teviston is a census-designated place (CDP) in Tulare County, California. It is approximately 3 mi. south of Pixley on highway 99 between Fresno and Bakersfield. The 2010 United States census reported Teviston's population was 1,214.

Geography
According to the United States Census Bureau, the CDP covers an area of 2.2 square miles (5.6 km), all of it land.

Demographics
At the 2010 census Teviston had a population of 1,214. The racial makeup of Teviston was 449 (37.0%) White, 50 (4.1%) African American, 9 (0.7%) Native American, 10 (0.8%) Asian, 0 (0.0%) Pacific Islander, 640 (52.7%) from other races, and 56 (4.6%) from two or more races. Hispanic or Latino of any race were 1,039 persons (85.6%).

There were 295 households, 191 (64.7%) had children under the age of 18 living in them, 181 (61.4%) were opposite-sex married couples living together, 41 (13.9%) had a female householder with no husband present, 32 (10.8%) had a male householder with no wife present.  There were 34 (11.5%) unmarried opposite-sex partnerships, and 0 (0%) same-sex married couples or partnerships. 26 households (8.8%) were one person and 11 (3.7%) had someone living alone who was 65 or older. The average household size was 4.12.  There were 254 families (86.1% of households); the average family size was 4.31.

The age distribution was 477 people (39.3%) under the age of 18, 144 people (11.9%) aged 18 to 24, 329 people (27.1%) aged 25 to 44, 193 people (15.9%) aged 45 to 64, and 71 people (5.8%) who were 65 or older.  The median age was 24.0 years. For every 100 females, there were 102.0 males.  For every 100 females age 18 and over, there were 104.2 males.

There were 352 housing units at an average density of 162.1 per square mile, of the occupied units 129 (43.7%) were owner-occupied and 166 (56.3%) were rented. The homeowner vacancy rate was 7.2%; the rental vacancy rate was 5.1%.  500 people (41.2% of the population) lived in owner-occupied housing units and 714 people (58.8%) lived in rental housing units.

Events
In June of 2021 the Teviston drinking water pump broke leaving the town without potable water during California's worst drought on record.

References

Census-designated places in Tulare County, California
Census-designated places in California